A travel management company (TMC) is a travel agency which manages organizations' corporate or business travel programs. Such companies will often provide an end-user online booking tool, mobile application, program management, and consulting teams, executive travel services, meetings and events support, reporting functionality, duty of care, and more. Non-Profit travel management companies also provide services to manage complex visa requirements, pre-trip medical needs, remote area travel, and immediate disaster relief planning. These companies use Global Distribution Systems (GDS) to book flights for their clients. This allows the travel consultant to compare different itineraries and costs by displaying availability in real-time, allowing users to access fares for air tickets, hotel rooms and rental cars simultaneously.

Some major TMCs include The Travel Group, American Express Global Business Travel, Egencia (part of Expedia Group), BCD Group, CWT (formerly Carlson Wagonlit Travel), FCM Travel Solutions, Tripactions and Travelperk.

References 

Travel management
Business travel